Ferocactus alamosanus is a species of Ferocactus from Mexico. The specific epithet, refers to the plant's occurrence at Álamos in the Mexican state of Sonora, in northwestern Mexico.

References

External links 
 
 

Alamosanus
Flora of Mexico
Plants described in 1913